Alphonso "Piggy" Gerard (June 26, 1916 - July 14, 2002) was a baseball outfielder in the Negro leagues. He played professionally in the United States from 1945 to 1948 with the New York Black Yankees, Indianapolis Clowns, and the Chicago American Giants. He was born and died on Saint Croix. Gerard was the only native of the Virgin Islands to play in the Negro Leagues.

The bulk of Gerard's pro career took place in the Puerto Rican Winter League. He played there from the 1944-45 season until retiring after the winter of 1957-58. He also played professionally in Mexico (1946) and the Dominican Republic (1953).

References

External links

 and Seamheads
SABR biography

1916 births
2002 deaths
New York Black Yankees players
Chicago American Giants players
Indianapolis Clowns players
People from Saint Croix, U.S. Virgin Islands
United States Virgin Islands baseball players
20th-century African-American sportspeople
Baseball outfielders
21st-century African-American people